Chorvátsky Grob is a village and municipality in western Slovakia in Senec District in the Bratislava region. It has a population of around 6,000 people.

The village's name Chorvátsky means Croatian. This refers to the Croatian people that have lived in the area since the early 16th century. This population arrived here after escaping the area between Sisak and Kostajnica during the Ottoman Wars. The area was settled by Croatians escaping from Turkish Ottoman raids which helps explain the etymology of the present-day name from "Horvát Gurab" to "Chorvátsky Grob" (Croatian Grave) used at the present time.

According to the local municipality website of Chorvátsky Grob the Slovak word for "grob" is " hrob" or, in English "grave". Reportedly, this place was named in memory of soldiers, though it is not clear if those soldiers were Croats, Slovaks or another ethnicity.

Twin towns – sister cities

Chorvátsky Grob is twinned with:
 Benkovac, Croatia

See also
List of municipalities and towns in Slovakia

References

Genealogical resources
The records for genealogical research are available at the state archive "Státný archiv in Bratislava, Slovakia"

 Roman Catholic church records (births/marriages/deaths): 1705–1896 (parish A)

External links

https://web.archive.org/web/20071116010355/http://www.statistics.sk/mosmis/eng/run.html
Municipal website 
Surnames of living people in Chorvatsky Grob

Villages and municipalities in Senec District
Croatian communities in Slovakia